Intra-flow interference is interference between intermediate routers sharing the same flow path.

Application
In wireless routing, routing protocol WCETT, MIC  and iAWARE incorporate consideration to the intra-flow interference metric.

See also
 Collision domain
 Inter-flow interference
 Interference (communication)

References

External links
Ubox10 Pro Max
WiFi With WishareFi

Wi-Fi